Sophia is a genus of parasitic flies in the family Tachinidae. There is one described species in Sophia, S. filipes.

Distribution
Brazil.

References

Diptera of South America
Dexiinae
Tachinidae genera
Monotypic Brachycera genera
Taxa named by Jean-Baptiste Robineau-Desvoidy